Petaloudes is a former municipality on the island of Rhodes, in the Dodecanese, Greece. Since the 2011 local government reform it is part of the municipality Rhodes, of which it is a municipal unit. Its population was 14,962 in 2011. It includes the villages of Kremasti, Paradisi, Theologos (Tholos), Damatria, Maritsa, and Pastida. The seat of the municipality was in Kremasti. The land area is 89.150 km2.

The Petaloudes Valley (sometimes known as Valley of the Butterflies) is home to thousands of the Rhodes subspecies of the Jersey tiger moth (Euplagia quadripunctaria rhodosensis) that cover the entire landscape after the wet season (late May) due to the high humidity in the area. The Oriental sweetgum trees in Petaloudes Valley give off a scent that attracts the moths and creates a unique biotope. Owing to the increased number of visitors, the Euplagia are facing population issues as they have no stomach and when disturbed tend to fly frequently and thus deplete their energy.

Gallery

External links

The Valley of the Butterflies

References

Populated places in Rhodes
Natura 2000 in Greece